Benjamin Kanes (born March 25, 1977) is an American actor, screenwriter, film director and producer, best known for portraying Young Birdman in the 2014 single shot black comedy-drama film film of the same name.

Early life
Kanes was born in Haverford, Pennsylvania.

Career
Kanes entered the film industry with roles in short subjects and documentaries, beginning in 2003. During the early years, he also worked as a body double and stuntman; most notably as a stand-in for the lead in Invincible, for Mark Wahlberg in Shooter and The Other Guys, for Jude Law in My Blueberry Nights, for Shia LaBeouf in Transformers: Revenge of the Fallen, and for Colin Farrell in Dead Man Down. He has also served as screenwriter, film editor, associate producer and short-subject producer during his career, and is best known for portraying Young Birdman and inner voice of Michael Keaton's Riggan Thomson in the 2014 single shot black comedy-drama film film Birdman or (The Unexpected Virtue of Ignorance), directed by Alejandro G. Iñárritu and written by Iñárritu with Nicolás Giacobone, Alexander Dinelaris Jr., and Armando Bó.

Filmography

References

External links

 

1977 births
Male actors from Pennsylvania
American male film actors
Living people
People from Haverford Township, Pennsylvania
21st-century American male actors